Qomishan may refer to:
 Qomishan, Isfahan
 Qomishan, West Azerbaijan

See also
 Qamishan (disambiguation)